Julio Kilenyi (February 21, 1885 Arad, Kingdom of Hungary (now in Romania)  - January 29, 1959) an American sculptor and medallic artist. In 1909, he moved to Buenos Aires, Argentina. Later he moved to New York. He began his career in the U.S. in 1916 and was known primarily as the designer of commemorative medals. His work was part of the sculpture event in the art competition at the 1932 Summer Olympics.

References

1885 births
1959 deaths
20th-century American sculptors
20th-century American male artists
American male sculptors
Olympic competitors in art competitions
Austro-Hungarian emigrants to Argentina
Argentine emigrants to the United States